The North East Community Development Council is one of five Community Development Councils (CDCs) set up across the Republic of Singapore to aid in local administration of governmental policies and schemes. They are funded in part by the government although they are free to engage in fund-raising activities.

Constituencies
As of March 2020, the North East district covers:

Single Member Constituency (SMC)
Hougang SMC
Punggol West SMC

Group Representation Constituency (GRC)
Aljunied GRC
Bedok Reservoir-Punggol
Eunos
Kaki Bukit
Paya Lebar
Serangoon
Pasir Ris–Punggol GRC
Pasir Ris East
Pasir Ris West
Pasir Ris Central
Punggol Shore
Punggol Coast
Sengkang GRC
Buangkok
Anchorvale
Compassvale
Rivervale
Tampines GRC
Tampines Central
Tampines Changkat
Tampines East
Tampines North
Tampines West

Mayors 
The incumbent Mayor of North East District is Desmond Choo of Tampines GRC since 2017.

See also
Community Development Council

References

External links
North East Community Development Council

Districts of Singapore
2001 establishments in Singapore
Organizations established in 2001